Gerard Huerta is an American typographer and graphic designer.
Born and raised in southern California, he graduated from Art Center College of Design and began his career at CBS Records in New York, creating artwork and logos for AC/DC, Boston, Willie Nelson, Ted Nugent, Blue Oyster Cult, Rick Derringer, Bob Dylan, Ramsey Lewis, The Isley Brothers, Harold Melvin and the Blue Notes, George Benson, Rupert Holmes, Stephen Stills, Alvin Lee, The Charlie Daniels Band and many others.

After leaving CBS Huerta designed lettering for AC/DC’s High Voltage and Let There Be Rock albums, the latter being adopted for the now iconic AC/DC lightning bolt logo. He also designed logos and covers for Foreigner, Firefall, Chicago and The Outlaws. Huerta collaborated with Roger Huyssen on the branding for the 1980 Clint Eastwood film Bronco Billy as well as Super Bowl XXVIII, and designed lettering for Super Bowl XXXIV, Coal Miner’s Daughter, Friday the 13th Part III, and the one-sheet artwork for Atlantic City and Star Trek III: The Search For Spock. He also created theme art logos for ten years for the annual Breeders’ Cup event.

Huerta expanded his work beyond the recording and movie industries to design logos for Swiss Army Brands, MSG Network, HBO, CBS Records Masterworks, Waldenbooks, Spelling Entertainment, Nabisco, Calvin Klein's Eternity, Arista Records, Type Directors Club, Pepsi, The National Guitar Museum, and Monterey Peninsula Country Club in addition to the mastheads of Time, Money, People, The Atlantic Monthly, PC Magazine, Adweek, Us, Condé Nast's Traveler, Working Mother, WordPerfect, The American Lawyer, The National Law Journal, The National Catholic Register, Illustration, Connecticut Post, and Architectural Digest as well as corporate alphabets for Waldenbooks, Time-Life, Pepsi and Condé Nast. He designed watch dials for the Original Swiss Army Watch and their complete line for fourteen years and also created original product illustrations.

Huerta also designed the multi-necked fully-playable stringed instrument known as The Rock Ock for the National Guitar Museum, which is on tour along with his Vintage Guitar Art. His work is in the permanent collection of The Museum of Modern Art.

External links 

Official website
An interview with Gerard Huerta

American typographers and type designers
American graphic designers
Art Center College of Design alumni
Living people
1952 births